Chah Mord (also Romanized as Chāh Mord) is a village in Golestan Rural District, in the Central District of Sirjan County, Kerman Province, Iran. At the 2006 census, its population was 121, in 29 families.

References 

Populated places in Sirjan County